Hans Koch (date of birth unknown) was a Swiss footballer who played in the 1890s as striker and as midfielder.

Football career
FC Basel was founded on 15 November 1893 and Koch joined the club about two years later, during their 1895–96 season. Koch played his first game for the club in the home game on 12 April 1896 as Basel won 3–0 against FC Excelsior Zürich. He also played in the return match which took place two weeks later.

In the following season Koch played in six of the teams seven matches. He stayed with the club for these two seasons and during his time with them, Koch played eight games for Basel without scoring a goal.

Notes

Footnotes

References

Sources
 Rotblau: Jahrbuch Saison 2017/2018. Publisher: FC Basel Marketing AG. 
 Die ersten 125 Jahre. Publisher: Josef Zindel im Friedrich Reinhardt Verlag, Basel. 
 Verein "Basler Fussballarchiv" Homepage
(NB: Despite all efforts, the editors of these books and the authors in "Basler Fussballarchiv" have failed to be able to identify all the players, their date and place of birth or date and place of death, who played in the games during the early years of FC Basel)

FC Basel players
Swiss men's footballers
Association football midfielders
Association football forwards